Principal aquifers of California are those principal aquifers of the United States that lie within (or rather, below) the California state boundaries. Per the Oxford Dictionary of Environment and Conservation, an aquifer is a "body of permeable and/or porous rock that is underlain by impermeable rock and through which groundwater is able to flow."

The state of California recognizes 515 groundwater basins and subbasins within these aquifers. The groundwater basin of a given aquifer may be managed by a water district; for example the Coachella Valley Water District manages the underground water in California's Coachella Valley groundwater basin (CA groundwater basin no. 7–021), which lies within the Colorado River hydrologic region, one of the 13 top-level California state hydrologic regions and drainage areas. The California state hydrologic regions and drainage areas are quite similar but not identical to the federal hydrologic unit system's California water resource region surface-water drainage basins. The California Department of Water Resources has detailed descriptions (online in PDF format, etc.) of each of the 515 state-recognized groundwater basins.

The principal aquifers of the United States are organized by national principal aquifer codes and names assigned by the National Water Information System (NWIS) of the United States Geological Survey. Aquifers are identified by a geohydrologic unit code (a three-digit number related to the age of the formation) followed by a four- or five-character abbreviation for the geologic unit or aquifer name.

See also
 Groundwater recharge
 Groundwater-dependent ecosystems 
 Saltwater intrusion in California
 Groundwater Ambient Monitoring and Assessment Program

References

Aquifers in California
Aquifers in the United States
Water in California